Ramgarh  Assembly constituency   is an assembly constituency in  the Indian state of Jharkhand.

Members of Assembly 
2001: Babulal Marandi, Bharatiya Janata Party
2005: Chandra Prakash Choudhary, All Jharkhand Students Union
2009: Chandra Prakash Choudhary, All Jharkhand Students Union
2014: Chandra Prakash Choudhary, All Jharkhand Students Union
2019: Mamta Devi, Indian National Congress
2023: Sunita Choudhary, All Jharkhand Students Union

Election results

2023 bye-election

2019

See also
Vidhan Sabha
List of states of India by type of legislature

References
Schedule – XIII of Constituencies Order, 2008 of Delimitation of Parliamentary and Assembly constituencies Order, 2008 of the Election Commission of India 

Assembly constituencies of Jharkhand